Sincerity is the virtue of one who communicates and acts in accordance with their feelings, beliefs, thoughts and desires.

Sincerity may also refer to:

Film
 Sincerity (1939 film), a 1939 Japanese film by Mikio Naruse
 Sincerity, a 1953 Japanese film by Masaki Kobayashi

Music
 "Sincerity", a song from the album Party by Iggy Pop
 "Sincerity", a song from the album In Strict Tempo by David Ball
 "Sincerity", a song from the album Affection by Lisa Stansfield
 "Sincerity", a song from the album Trust in Few by We Are Defiance

Places
 Sincerity, Wetzel County, West Virginia, an unincorporated community in West Virginia, United States